John Leslie Prescott, Baron Prescott (born 31 May 1938) is a British politician who served as Deputy Prime Minister of the United Kingdom from 1997 to 2007 and as First Secretary of State from 2001 to 2007. A member of the Labour Party, he was Member of Parliament (MP) for Kingston upon Hull East for 40 years, from 1970 to 2010. He was seen as the political link to the working class in a Labour Party increasingly led by modernising, middle-class professionals such as Tony Blair and Peter Mandelson and developed a reputation as a key conciliator in the often stormy relationship between Blair and Gordon Brown.

Born in Prestatyn, Wales, in his youth Prescott failed the eleven-plus entrance exam for grammar school and worked as a ship's steward and trade union activist. He went on to graduate from Ruskin College and the University of Hull. In the 1994 Labour Party leadership election, he stood for both the leadership and deputy leadership, winning election to the latter office. He was appointed Deputy Prime Minister after Labour's victory in the 1997 election, with an expanded brief as Secretary of State for the Environment, Transport and the Regions until 2001 then subsequently First Secretary of State until 2007. In June 2007, he resigned as Deputy Prime Minister, coinciding with Tony Blair's resignation as Prime Minister. Following an election within the Labour Party, he was replaced as deputy leader by Harriet Harman.

After retiring as a Member of Parliament at the 2010 general election, Prescott entered the House of Lords as a life peer with the title Baron Prescott, of Kingston upon Hull in the County of East Yorkshire. He stood as the Labour candidate in the 2012 election to be the first Police and Crime Commissioner for Humberside Police but lost to Conservative Party candidate Matthew Grove. Prescott resigned from the Privy Council in 2013 to protest delays to the introduction of press regulation of which he had become a proponent. In February 2015, he returned to politics as an adviser to Labour leader Ed Miliband.

Early life 
The son of John Herbert Prescott, a railway signalman and Labour councillor, and Phyllis, and the grandson of a miner, Prescott was born in Prestatyn, Wales, on 31 May 1938. In 2009, he said: "I've always felt very proud of Wales and being Welsh...I was born in Wales, went to school in Wales and my mother was Welsh. I'm Welsh. It's my place of birth, my country." He left Wales in 1942 at the age of four and was brought up initially in Brinsworth in the West Riding of Yorkshire, England. He attended Brinsworth Manor School, where in 1949 he sat but failed the 11-Plus examination to attend Rotherham Grammar School. Shortly afterwards, his family moved to Upton-by-Chester, and he attended Grange Secondary Modern School in nearby Ellesmere Port.

Prescott became a steward and waiter in the Merchant Navy, thus avoiding National Service, working for Cunard, and was a popular left-wing union activist. Prescott's time in the Merchant Navy included a cruise from England to New Zealand in 1957. Among the passengers was former British Prime Minister Sir Anthony Eden, recuperating after his resignation over the Suez Crisis. Prescott reportedly described Eden as a "real gentleman". Apart from serving Eden, who stayed in his cabin much of the time, Prescott also won several boxing contests, at which Eden presented the prizes. He married Pauline "Tilly" Tilston at Upton Church in Chester on 11 November 1961. He then went to Ruskin College, which specialises in courses for union officials, where he gained a diploma in economics and politics in 1965. In 1968, he obtained a BSc degree in economics and economic history from the University of Hull.

Member of Parliament 
Prescott returned to the National Union of Seamen as a full-time official before being elected to the House of Commons as Member of Parliament (MP) for Kingston upon Hull East in 1970, succeeding Commander Harry Pursey, the retiring Labour MP. The defeated Conservative challenger was Norman Lamont. Previously, he had attempted to become MP for Southport in 1966, but came in second place, approximately 9,500 votes behind the Conservative candidate. From July 1975 to 1979, he concurrently served as a Member of the European Parliament (MEP) and Leader of the Labour Group, when its members were nominated by the national Parliaments. In 1988 Prescott and Eric Heffer challenged Roy Hattersley for the deputy leadership of the party, but Roy Hattersley was reelected as deputy leader. Prescott stood again in the 1992 deputy leadership election, following Hattersley's retirement, but lost to Margaret Beckett.

Prescott held various posts in Labour's Shadow Cabinet, but his career was secured by an impassioned closing speech in the debate at the Labour Party Conference in 1993 on the introduction of "one member, one vote" for the selection and reselection of Labour Parliamentary candidates that helped swing the vote in favour of this reform. In 1994 Prescott was a candidate in the party leadership election that followed the death of John Smith, standing for the positions of both leader and deputy leader. Tony Blair  won the leadership contest, with Prescott being elected deputy leader.

Deputy Prime Minister 
With the formation of a Labour government in 1997, Prescott was made Deputy Prime Minister and given a very large portfolio as the head of the newly created Department for Environment, Transport and the Regions. In the United Kingdom, the title of Deputy Prime Minister is used only occasionally, and confers no constitutional powers (in which it is similar to the pre-20th century usage of Prime Minister). The Deputy Prime Minister stands in when the Prime Minister is unavailable, most visibly at Prime minister's questions, and Prescott had attended various Heads of Government meetings on behalf of then Prime Minister Tony Blair.

Since the position of Deputy Prime Minister draws no salary, Prescott's remuneration was based on his position as Secretary of State for the Environment, Transport and the Regions until 2001. This "super department" was then broken up, with the Department for Environment, Food and Rural Affairs and the Department for Transport established as separate entities. Prescott, still Deputy Prime Minister, was also given the largely honorific title of First Secretary of State. In July 2001 an Office of the Deputy Prime Minister (ODPM) was created to administer the areas remaining under his responsibility. This was originally part of the Cabinet Office, but became a department in its own right in May 2002, when it absorbed some of the responsibilities of the former Department for Transport, Local Government and the Regions. The ODPM had responsibility for local and regional government, housing, communities and the fire service.

Environment, Transport and the Regions

Environment 
The UK played a major role in the successful negotiations on the Kyoto Protocol on climate change and Prescott led the UK delegation at the discussions. In May 2006, in recognition of his work in delivering the Kyoto Treaty, Tony Blair asked him to work with the Foreign Secretary and the Environment Secretary on developing the Government's post-Kyoto agenda.

As minister on 24 August 1999 Prescott signed into law a ban on the use of Chrysotile Asbestos which resulted in a complete ban on the usage of any Asbestos containing products in the United Kingdom from 24 November 1999.

Integrated transport policy 
On coming to office, Prescott pursued an integrated public transport policy. On 6 June 1997, he said: "I will have failed if in five years time there are not...far fewer journeys by car. It's a tall order but I urge you to hold me to it." However, by June 2002, car traffic was up by 7%. This prompted Friends of the Earth's Tony Bosworth to say "By its own test, Government transport policy has failed".

Prescott had success in focusing attention on the role of car usage in the bigger environmental picture and the need for effective public transport alternatives if car volume is to be reduced. The subsequent debate on road pricing evolved from his policy. A contrast was highlighted between Prescott's transport brief and an incident, in 1999, when an official chauffeur-driven car was used to transport Prescott and his wife  from their hotel to the venue of the Labour Party Conference, where Prescott gave a speech on how to encourage the use of public transport. Prescott explained, "Because of the security reasons for one thing and second, my wife doesn't like to have her hair blown about. Have you got another silly question?" Prescott has been fined for speeding on four occasions.

Rail regulation 
Prescott had a stormy relationship with the privatisation of the railway industry. He had vigorously opposed the privatisation of the industry while the Labour Party was in opposition, and disliked the party's policy, established in 1996 just before the flotation of Railtrack on the London Stock Exchange, of committing to renationalise the industry only when resources allowed, which he saw as meaning that it would never be done. Reluctantly, he supported the alternative policy, produced by then shadow transport secretary Clare Short, that the industry should be subjected to closer regulation by the to-be-created Strategic Rail Authority (in the case of the passenger train operators) and the Rail Regulator (in the case of the monopoly and dominant elements in the industry, principally Railtrack). The policy was spelled out in some detail in the Labour Party's statement in the June 1996 prospectus for the sale of Railtrack shares, and was widely regarded as having depressed the price of the shares.

In 1998, Prescott was criticised by Transport Minister John Reid for his statement – at the Labour Party conference that year – that the privatised railway was a "national disgrace", despite receiving a standing ovation from the Labour Party audience. The companies felt that they had had some considerable successes in cutting costs and generating new revenues in the short time since their transfer to private sector hands, and that the criticisms were premature and unfair.

In that speech, Prescott also announced that he would be taking a far tougher line with the companies, and to that end he would be having a "spring clean" of the industry. This meant that the incumbent Director of Passenger Rail Franchising – John O'Brien – and the Rail Regulator John Swift QC – both appointed by the previous Conservative government, would have to make way for new Labour appointees.

In July 1998, Prescott, published a transport White Paper stating that the rail industry needed an element of stability and certainty if it was to plan its activities effectively.

In February 1999, the regulation of the passenger rail operators fell to Sir Alastair Morton, who Prescott announced would be appointed as chairman of the Strategic Rail Authority, which would take over from the Director of Passenger Rail Franchising whose office would be wound up. In July 1999, the new Rail Regulator appointed by Prescott was Tom Winsor. They shared Prescott's view that the railway industry needed a considerable shake-up in its institutional, operational, engineering and economic matrix to attract and retain private investment and enable the companies within it to become strong, competent and successful.

Local and regional government 
Responsible for local government, Prescott introduced a new system guiding members' conduct after 2001. The new system included a nationally agreed Code of Conduct laid down by Statutory Instrument which all local authorities were required to adopt; the Code of Conduct gives guidance on when councillors have an interest in a matter under discussion and when that interest is prejudicial so that the councillor may not speak or vote on the matter. Although on many areas councillors had previously been expected to withdraw where they had declared an interest, the new system made the system more formal and introduced specific sanctions for breaches; it was criticised for preventing councillors from representing the views of their local communities.

Prescott supported regional government in England. Early in his term, he introduced regional assemblies (consisting of delegates from local authorities and other regional stakeholders) to oversee the work of new Regional Development Agencies in the regions of England. Following Labour's second election victory, he pressed for the introduction of elected regional assemblies, which would have seen about 25 to 35 members elected under a similar electoral system to that used for the London Assembly. However, because of opposition, the government was forced to hold regional referendums on the change. The first three were intended to be in the North-East, North-West and Yorkshire and the Humber. The North-East referendum in November 2004 was first (where support was felt to be strongest) but resulted in an overwhelming vote of 78% against. As a consequence, the plan for elected regional assemblies was shelved.

Housing 
A rising number of households (especially in the south-east) were putting added pressure on housing during Prescott's tenure as the minister responsible. An increase in the housebuilding was proposed, primarily on brownfield sites, but also on some undeveloped greenfield areas and as a result he was accused of undermining the Green Belt. During a radio interview in January 1998, Prescott was asked about housing development on the green belt; intending to convey that the government would enlarge green belt protection, Prescott replied: "It's a Labour achievement, and we mean to build on it". He had not intended to make a joke and was distressed when it prompted laughter.

In the north of England, Prescott approved the demolition of some 200,000 homes that were judged to be in "failing areas" as part of his Pathfinder regeneration scheme. It has been argued that renovating properties, rather than demolishing them, would have made better financial and community sense.

Prescott led the campaign to abolish council housing, which ran out of steam when tenants in Birmingham voted to stay with the council in 2002. A previous attempt to privatise all the council housing in the London Borough of Camden failed in 1997.

Opposition to education reforms 
On 17 December 2005, Prescott made public his disapproval of Tony Blair's plans to give state schools the right to govern their finances and admission policies and to increase the number of city academies. It was the first policy stance that Prescott had made against Blair since his election as leader in 1994. Prescott said that the move would create a two-tier educational system that would discriminate against the working class. He added that Labour were "always better fighting class".

Links with the grass roots 
Prescott, sometimes described as "an old-school unionist", kept in touch with the views of the traditional Labour voters throughout his career. He became an important figure in Tony Blair's "New Labour" movement, as the representative of 'old Labour' interests in the Shadow Cabinet and subsequently around the Cabinet table as Deputy Prime Minister.

However, now a member of the establishment, relationships with the grass roots were not always smooth. Whilst attending the BRIT Awards in 1998, Chumbawamba vocalist Danbert Nobacon poured a jug of iced water over Prescott, saying, "This is for the Liverpool Dockers". (Dock workers in Liverpool had been involved in a two-year industrial dispute: a strike that had turned into a lock-out, until a few weeks earlier.) A reporter from the Daily Mirror threw water over Nobacon the following day.

Abolition of department 
In a Cabinet reshuffle on 5 May 2006, Prescott's departmental responsibilities were transferred to Ruth Kelly, as Secretary of State for Communities and Local Government, following revelations about his private life and a poor performance by Labour in that year's local elections. He remained as Deputy Prime Minister, with a seat in the Cabinet, and was given a role as a special envoy to the Far East as well as additional responsibilities chairing cabinet committees. Despite having lost his departmental responsibilities it was announced that he would retain his full salary (£134,000pa) and pension entitlements, along with both his grace-and-favour homes, an announcement which received considerable criticism.

The press speculated in July 2006 that, as a consequence of the continuing problems centred on Prescott, Blair was preparing to replace him as Deputy Prime Minister with David Miliband, whilst possibly retaining Prescott as Deputy Leader of the Labour Party, but nothing came of this.

Announcement of retirement 
In a speech to the 2006 Labour Party Conference in Manchester, Prescott apologised for the bad press he had caused the party during the previous year. He said: "I know in the last year I let myself down, I let you down. So Conference, I just want to say sorry", and confirmed that he would stand down as deputy leader when Blair resigned the premiership. Prescott subsequently announced in the House of Commons that he was "... in a rather happy demob stage", in January 2007.

Within 30 minutes of Blair announcing the date of his resignation on 10 May 2007, Prescott announced his resignation as Deputy Leader of the Labour Party. During the subsequent special Labour Party Conference, at which Gordon Brown was elected Leader and Harriet Harman succeeded Prescott as Deputy Leader, Prescott received a prolonged standing ovation from the members present, in recognition of his many years of service to the party.

Life after government 
Following his resignation, it was announced that he would take over from Tony Lloyd as the lead UK Representative in the Parliamentary Assembly of the Council of Europe. In a jocular response to the appointment, Shadow Europe Minister Mark Francois wished the translators good luck. The post is unpaid but has an expenses allowance and allows him to sit on the Assembly of the Western European Union. He has used his role on the council to make his campaign against slave labour a key issue.

On 27 August 2007, Prescott stated that he would stand down as an MP at the next general election. His autobiography, Prezza, My Story: Pulling no Punches was published on 29 May 2008 and ghostwritten by Hunter Davies. During the 2010 general election campaign, Prescott toured the UK in a customised white transit van dubbed his "Battlebus" canvassing support for the Labour Party. Prescott was publicly very supportive of Gordon Brown, and has called him a "global giant".

It was announced on 28 May 2010 that Prescott was to be awarded a life peerage, The peerage was gazetted on 15 June in the 2010 Dissolution Honours. Prescott has stated in interviews that he is not religious. He chose to make a non-religious solemn affirmation rather than swearing an oath during his introduction in the House of Lords. He was introduced into the House on 8 July as Baron Prescott, of Kingston upon Hull in the County of East Yorkshire, and the Letters Patent were gazetted on 12 July, dated 7 July.

Prescott is a director of Super League rugby league club Hull Kingston Rovers, who are based in his former constituency of Kingston upon Hull East. Prescott ran for Labour Party Treasurer in September 2010 but was defeated by Diana Holland, who took 68.96% of the total vote.

On 30 July 2010, Prescott appeared before the panel at the Chilcot Inquiry concerning the Iraq War. Prescott stated that he was doubtful about the legality, intelligence and information about Iraq's Weapons of Mass Destruction. The inquiry was launched by Gordon Brown in the summer of 2009 shortly after operations in the war ended. In 2016, after publication of the resultant Chilcot Report, which was critical of the war but remained neutral on its legality, Prescott declared that the invasion by UK and US forces had been "illegal" and that members of Tony Blair's Cabinet "were given too little paper documentation to make decisions".

In February 2012 Prescott announced he would stand for Labour's nomination in the election to be the first Police and Crime Commissioner for Humberside Police. In June he was selected as the Labour candidate for the election in November 2012. In the November election Prescott won the most first preference votes but ended up losing to Conservative Matthew Grove in the second count.

In March 2013, Prescott suggested that the Queen, Elizabeth II, should abdicate due to her health. Prescott was criticised for his position by several MPs.

On 6 July 2013, Prescott revealed in a newspaper column that he had resigned from the Privy Council in protest against the delays to the introduction of press regulation. The resignation only became effective on 6 November the same year. The Coalition Government had insisted that the Privy Council must consider a cross-party Royal Charter to underpin a new system of regulation, but that this meant that a final decision would not be taken before 2015.

On 21 February 2015, it was announced Prescott would return to politics as an adviser to Labour leader Ed Miliband.

In October 2015, Prescott was presented with the Shechtman International Leadership Award at the Sustainable Industrial Processing Summit 2015 in Antalya, Turkey, for his contributions to sustainable development in politics.

Television appearances 
In June 2008, Prescott made a cameo appearance, playing a policeman, in the BBC Radio 4 adaptation of Robert Tressell's The Ragged Trousered Philanthropists. In 2009, he made a brief cameo appearance as himself in the final episode of the BBC Three comedy series Gavin & Stacey (this referred to a running joke in the show regarding a relationship the character Nessa had had with him many years previously). Beginning on 7 January 2011, Prescott appeared in a TV advert for price comparison website moneysupermarket.com, along with comedian Omid Djalili, which gently mocks events in his political career. On 27 February 2011, he appeared on the BBC's Top Gear as the "Star in the Reasonably Priced Car", where he set a lap time of 1.56.7, the second slowest in a Kia Ceed. He also engaged in a discussion with host Jeremy Clarkson regarding his time in Government. He appeared as himself in the 2014 Comic Relief film David Walliams' Exes.

In October and November 2008, Prescott was the subject of a two-part documentary, Prescott: the Class System and Me, on BBC Two, looking at the class system in Britain, and asking whether it still exists. In 2009, he featured in the BBC Wales TV series Coming Home about his Welsh family history, with roots in Prestatyn and Chirk. In October 2009, he was featured in another BBC Two documentary, Prescott: The North/South Divide, in which he and his wife Pauline explored the current state of the North-South Divide from their perspective as Northern Englanders long used to living in the south of the country.

In 2019, Prescott hosted the television series Made in Britain, which explored the manufacturing of some of Britain's favourite foods.

Controversies

Council tax 
In 2003, Prescott gave up a home that he had rented from the RMT Union in Clapham; he had left the union in June 2002. Prescott paid £220 a month for the property – a fifth of its market value. Though he had not declared the flat in the register of members' interests, he was subsequently exonerated by MPs who overruled Elizabeth Filkin, the Parliamentary Commissioner for Standards. On 12 January 2006, Prescott apologised after it was revealed that the council tax for the government flat he occupied at Admiralty House was paid from public money, rather than his private income. He repaid the amount, which came to £3,830.52 over nearly nine years.

Sexual infidelities 
Prescott has come under fire for additional controversies over sexual infidelities. On 26 April 2006, he admitted to having had an affair with his diary secretary, Tracey Temple, between 2002 and 2004. This two-year affair is said to have commenced after an office party and, in part, took place during meetings at Prescott's grace-and-favour flat in Whitehall. Conservative MP Andrew Robathan tabled questions in the House of Commons over Prescott's reported entertainment of Temple at Dorneywood, his official residence, which raised questions over the possible misuse of public finances.

He was criticised for maintaining the benefits of Deputy Prime Minister despite losing his department in 2006. He was criticised for visiting the American billionaire Phil Anschutz who was bidding for the government licence to build a super casino in the UK, and questioned over his involvement in the business of his son Johnathan Prescott. He was photographed playing croquet at Dorneywood, his then "grace and favour" home, when Tony Blair was out of the country on a visit to Washington. Prescott was mocked in the media – in part because the game was so divorced from his working-class roots – and he gave up the use of the house. He later said that it had been his staff's idea to play croquet and that contrary to press reports, he had not been Acting Prime Minister when he had played the game.

Sexual assault allegation 
On 7 May 2006, The Sunday Times quoted Linda McDougall, wife of Austin Mitchell, as saying that in 1978 Prescott had pushed her "quite forcefully" against a wall and put his hand up her skirt as she opened the door for him to a meeting in her own house just after her husband became an MP; Prescott had not previously met her.

Expenses claims 
On 8 May 2009, The Daily Telegraph began publishing leaked details of MPs' expenses. The Telegraph reported that Prescott had claimed £312 for fitting mock Tudor beams to his constituency home, and for two new toilet seats in as many years. Prescott responded by saying, "Every expense was within the rules of the House of Commons on claiming expenses at the time".

2001 Rhyl incident 

On 16 May 2001, when arriving for a rally in Rhyl, Prescott was assaulted by a pro-hunting advocate throwing an egg at him. Prescott retaliated by punching the protester. A momentary ensuing scuffle was broken up by police and bystanders. This earned Prescott the nickname "Two Jabs".

Public profile 
Prescott gained a reputation in the British press for confused speech, mangled syntax and poor grammar. The Guardian columnist Simon Hoggart once commented: "Every time Prescott opens his mouth, it's like someone has flipped open his head and stuck in an egg whisk." An oft-quoted but unverified story in Jeremy Paxman's The Political Animal is that, before being accepted as transcribers to the Parliamentary record Hansard, applicants must listen to one of Prescott's speeches and write down what they think he was trying to say. However, Liz Davies wrote that on the Labour National Executive Committee, Prescott "spoke in clear, concise sentences and his point was always understandable. Contrary to his television and parliamentary image, he appears to choose his words with care."

The media have attached various sobriquets to Prescott during his political career. Originally, Prescott's nickname was "Prezza", but as various misfortunes befell him the sobriquets became more colourful, leading to "Two Jags", which set the template for later nicknames. Prescott owns one Jaguar, and had the use of another as his official ministerial car. A later version of this term was "Two Jabs", following his retaliation against a protester farmer in 2001, and "Two Shacks", referring to his former country house. When he lost his department in a cabinet reshuffle following exposure of his affair, newspapers dubbed him "Two Shags" and "No Jobs". Banned from driving after being convicted of speeding in 1991, Prescott was banned again after a similar conviction in June 2015. This led to him being nicknamed "Two bans".

Prescott has been involved in a number of incidents that have caused widespread media interest. During the 2001 election campaign, Prescott was campaigning in Rhyl, Denbighshire, when one Craig Evans threw an egg at him. Prescott, a former amateur boxer, responded immediately with a straight left to the jaw. The incident, overshadowing the launch of the Labour Party manifesto on that day, was captured by television cameras. Tony Blair responded by stating: "John is John". A National Opinion Polls (NOP) survey found that the incident did no public harm to Prescott, and may even have benefited his standing amongst male voters. Speaking on Top Gear, Prescott stated: "I was against fox-hunting, and he thought I was one of the guys he hated because I wanted to keep fox-hunting". He elaborated

Personal life

Family 
Prescott and Pauline Tilston married in 1961. They have two sons. The elder, Johnathan Prescott, is a businessman. Their younger son, David Prescott, is active in Labour Party politics and works in the office of former party leader Jeremy Corbyn; he failed to be selected for his father's parliamentary seat in Hull but was the Labour candidate for Gainsborough in 2015. Pauline had a son by an American airman in the 1950s, whom she gave up for adoption.

Health concerns 
Prescott was diagnosed with diabetes in 1990, although this was not publicly disclosed until 2002. On 2 June 2007 he was admitted to hospital after being taken ill on a train from his constituency in Hull to London King's Cross. He was later diagnosed with pneumonia and was treated at University College Hospital, London. He was moved to a high-dependency ward on 5 June 2007 so he could be monitored more closely because of his age and the fact he suffers from diabetes. On 6 June 2007 it was reported in the media that his condition was stable and that he was sitting up and "joking" with hospital staff. He was subsequently released from hospital on 10 June 2007 to continue his recovery at home.

In April 2008, Prescott recounted having suffered from the eating disorder bulimia nervosa, which he believed was brought on by stress, from the 1980s until 2007.

Prescott was admitted to Hull Royal Infirmary on 21 June 2019 after suffering a stroke. He subsequently returned to his duties.

Bibliography

See also 
Cabinet of the United Kingdom

Notes

References

External links 

 Parliamentary profile 
 
 
 
 BBC Profile, 5 May 2006
 John Prescott's gift of the gaffe, BBC News, 6 June 2003

|-

|-

|-

|-

|-

|-

|-

|-

|-

|-

1938 births
Alumni of Ruskin College
Alumni of the University of Hull
British Secretaries of State for the Environment
Deputy Prime Ministers of the United Kingdom
First Secretaries of State of the United Kingdom
Labour Party (UK) MEPs
Labour Party (UK) MPs for English constituencies
Labour Party (UK) life peers
Living people
MEPs for the United Kingdom 1973–1979
Members of the Privy Council of the United Kingdom
People who resigned from the Privy Council of the United Kingdom
National Union of Seamen-sponsored MPs
Life peers created by Elizabeth II
People from Prestatyn
Politicians from Kingston upon Hull
Politics of the East Riding of Yorkshire
Seamen from Kingston upon Hull
Secretaries of State for Transport (UK)
Trade unionists from Kingston upon Hull
UK MPs 1970–1974
UK MPs 1974
UK MPs 1974–1979
UK MPs 1979–1983
UK MPs 1983–1987
UK MPs 1987–1992
UK MPs 1992–1997
UK MPs 1997–2001
UK MPs 2001–2005
UK MPs 2005–2010
Welsh sailors
British republicans